Palaquium is a genus of about 120 species of trees in the family Sapotaceae. Their range is from India across Southeast Asia, Malesia, Papuasia, and Australasia, to the western Pacific Islands.

Description
Within their range, Palaquium species are mostly found in the Philippines and Borneo. In Borneo, many species are recorded in the Malaysian states of Sabah and Sarawak.

The leaves are typically spirally arranged and often clustered near twig ends. Flowers are mostly bisexual, though some unisexual instances are known. Fruits are one- or two-seeded with rare instances of several seeds. Palaquium habitats are coastal, lowland mixed dipterocarp, swamp, and montane forests.

Some species, for example Palaquium gutta, are well known for producing gutta-percha latex.

Species
 The Plant List recognises 120 accepted species:

References

External links

 
Sapotaceae genera
Taxa named by Francisco Manuel Blanco